Lalnunsiama (born 28 January 1998) is an Indian professional footballer who plays as a defender for South United in the I-League 2nd Division.

Career
Born in Mizoram, Lalnunsiama was part of the DSK Shivajians youth set-up. He was promoted to the first-team during the 2016-17 season before the 2016 Durand Cup. On 26 February 2017, Lalnunsiama made his professional debut for DSK Shivajians in the I-League against Churchill Brothers. He started and played the full match but couldn't prevent DSK Shivajians from losing 3–0.

Goa B
After the I-League season ended, Lalnunsiama joined the reserve side of Indian Super League club Goa.

Career statistics

References

1998 births
Living people
People from Mizoram
Indian footballers
DSK Shivajians FC players
FC Goa players
Association football defenders
Footballers from Mizoram
I-League players
Goa Professional League players